Jaan Santa (also Jaan or Robert Liimann; 1880–?) was an Estonian politician. He was a member of I Riigikogu. On 19 January 1921, he resigned his position and he was replaced by Villem Tiideman.

References

1880 births
Year of death missing
Central Committee of Tallinn Trade Unions politicians
Members of the Riigikogu, 1920–1923